Half of Hastings Borough Council in East Sussex, England is elected every two years, while before 2002 the council was elected by thirds. Since the last boundary changes in 2002, 32 councillors have been elected from 16 wards. The Council has been held by Labour since 2010.

Political control
Since the first election to the council in 1973 political control of the council has been held by the following parties:

Leadership
The leaders of the council since 2001 have been:

Council elections
1973 Hastings Borough Council election
1976 Hastings Borough Council election
1979 Hastings Borough Council election (New ward boundaries)
1980 Hastings Borough Council election
1982 Hastings Borough Council election
1983 Hastings Borough Council election
1984 Hastings Borough Council election
1986 Hastings Borough Council election
1987 Hastings Borough Council election
1988 Hastings Borough Council election
1990 Hastings Borough Council election
1991 Hastings Borough Council election
1992 Hastings Borough Council election
1994 Hastings Borough Council election
1995 Hastings Borough Council election
1996 Hastings Borough Council election

Borough result maps

By-election results

1997-2001

2001-2005

2005-2009

2009-2013

2014-2019

References

By-election results

External links
Hastings Borough Council

 
Politics of Hastings
Hastings
Hastings